David Keys may refer to:

 David Keys (musician) (born 1979), English theremin player
 David Keys (author), British archaeologist

See also
 David M. Key (1824–1900), senator